

This is a list of the National Register of Historic Places listings in Shelby County, Tennessee.

This is intended to be a complete list of the properties and districts on the National Register of Historic Places in Shelby County, Tennessee, United States. Latitude and longitude coordinates are provided for many National Register properties and districts; these locations may be seen together in a map.

There are 200 properties and districts listed on the National Register in the county, including 4 National Historic Landmarks.  There are 23 properties that have been removed from the register.

Current listings

|}

Former listings
Twenty-three other properties were once listed, but have now been removed:

|}

See also

 List of National Historic Landmarks in Tennessee
 National Register of Historic Places listings in Tennessee

References

 01
Shelby
Buildings and structures in Shelby County, Tennessee
Shelby County, Tennessee